The 1994–95 Old Dominion Monarchs men's basketball team represented Old Dominion University in the 1994–95 college basketball season. This was head coach Jeff Capel's first of seven seasons at Old Dominion. The Monarchs competed in the Colonial Athletic Association and played their home games at the ODU Fieldhouse. They finished the season 21–12, 12–2 in CAA play to finish as regular season conference champions. They went on to win the 1995 CAA men's basketball tournament to earn the CAA's automatic bid to the NCAA tournament. They earned a 14 seed in the East Region where they upset No. 3 seed Villanova in the opening round. The Monarchs fell to No. 6 seed Tulsa in the second round.

Roster

Schedule and results

|-
!colspan=9 style=| Regular season

|-
!colspan=10 style=| CAA tournament

|-
!colspan=10 style=| NCAA tournament

References

Old Dominion
Old Dominion Monarchs men's basketball seasons
Old Dominion
Old Dominion
Old Dominion